Guelavía may refer to:

Guelavía Zapotec, Zapotec language in Oaxaca, Mexico
San Juan Guelavía, town and municipality in Oaxaca, Mexico